Malachi Nelson is an American football quarterback.

Early life and high school
Nelson lives in Los Alamitos, California and attends Los Alamitos High School. He began receiving scholarship offers to play college football while he was in the eighth grade. As a freshman as Los Alamitos, Nelson passed for 883 yards with eight touchdowns and five interceptions. Nelson completed 73.9% of his passes for 1,513 yards and 23 touchdowns during his sophomore season.

Nelson was rated a five-star recruit and committed to play college football at Oklahoma during the summer prior to his junior year over offers from Alabama, Florida State, LSU, Notre Dame, Ohio State, and USC. Nelson was named the Press-Telegram Player of the Year after passing for 2,690 yards and 39 touchdowns in his junior season. He decommitted shortly after the departure of Oklahoma head coach Lincoln Riley. Nelson then committed to play at USC. Nelson competed in the finals of the 2022 Elite 11 quarterback competition. Entering his senior season, he was ranked the best recruit in the nation by ESPN.

College career
Nelson joined the USC Trojans as an early enrollee in January 2023.

Personal life
Nelson's father, Eric, is a pastor. Nelson signed a Name, Image and Likeness (NIL) deal with a Los Angeles-based hospitality firm shortly after the conclusion of his junior year of high school.

References

External links
USC Trojans bio

Living people
Players of American football from California
American football quarterbacks
Year of birth missing (living people)